Diondre Michael Borel (born December 12, 1988) is an American football wide receiver for the Fayetteville Mustangs of the National Arena League (NAL). After playing college football for Utah State University, he was signed as an undrafted free agent by the Green Bay Packers in 2011. Borel was Utah State's starting quarterback from 2008 to 2010, finishing his collegiate career ranked second in school history with 6,698 passing yards and 8,096 yards total offense.

College career
Borel earned a scholarship from Utah State University after a distinguished prep career at Freedom High School in Oakley, California. He was a multiple threat at Utah State, serving as starting quartback and punter. Borel was a three-year starter at quarterback at Utah State, where he threw for 6,698 yards and tallied 8,096 yards of total offense during his college career.

Statistics

Source:

Professional career

Green Bay Packers
He went unselected in the 2011 NFL Draft, and signed as a free agent with the Green Bay Packers, who converted him to wide receiver. Borel spent his first year in the NFL on Green Bay's practice squad.

Tennessee Titans
In 2012, he was signed by the Tennessee Titans, after spending several weeks on the practice squad of the Tampa Bay Buccaneers. On August 26, 2013, he was waived by the Titans.

San Jose SaberCats
On November 19, 2014, Borel was assigned to the San Jose SaberCats of the Arena Football League.

Spokane Empire
On April 27, 2016, Borel signed with the Spokane Empire of the Indoor Football League (IFL).

Los Angeles KISS
On July 31, 2016, Borel was assigned to the Los Angeles KISS.

Arizona Rattlers
On October 28, 2016, Borel signed with the Arizona Rattlers. On July 8, 2017, the Rattlers defeated the Sioux Falls Storm in the United Bowl by a score of 50–41.

The Spring League
Borel participated in The Spring League Showcase game in July 2017.

Wasa Royals
Borel signed with Finnish Maple League team Wasa Royals before 2019 season.

Fayetteville Mustangs
On February 21, 2023, Borel signed with the Fayetteville Mustangs of the National Arena League (NAL).

References

External links
 Green Bay Packers bio
 Utah State Aggies bio

1988 births
Living people
Players of American football from San Jose, California
American football quarterbacks
American football wide receivers
Utah State Aggies football players
Tampa Bay Buccaneers players
San Jose SaberCats players
Spokane Empire players
Los Angeles Kiss players
Arizona Rattlers players
People from Oakley, California
Green Bay Packers players
The Spring League players